Marc Mas Costa (born 1 June 1990) is a Spanish footballer who plays as a forward for Linares Deportivo.

References

External links

Beticopedia profile 

1990 births
Living people
People from Selva
Sportspeople from the Province of Girona
Spanish footballers
Footballers from Catalonia
Association football forwards
Segunda División B players
Tercera División players
Girona FC players
RCD Espanyol B footballers
UE Costa Brava players
CF Badalona players
UE Figueres footballers
UE Sant Andreu footballers
Betis Deportivo Balompié footballers
CD Guadalajara (Spain) footballers
CF Peralada players
UE Olot players
Linares Deportivo footballers
Allsvenskan players
GIF Sundsvall players
Spanish expatriate footballers
Spanish expatriate sportspeople in Sweden
Expatriate footballers in Sweden